The Idea of You is an upcoming romantic comedy drama for Amazon Studios starring Anne Hathaway based on a Robinne Lee novel of the same name. The director is Michael Showalter and the screenplay adaptation is by Jennifer Westfeldt.

Synopsis
After her ex-husband lets down her teenage daughter, a 40-year-old divorcee attends the music festival Coachella and inadvertently runs into the most famous pop star in the world.

Cast
 Anne Hathaway as Solène
 Nicholas Galitzine as Hayes Campbell
 Ella Rubin as Izzy 
 Reid Scott as Dan
 Jordan Aaron Hall
 Jaiden Anthony
 Raymond Cham
 Vik White
 Dakota Adan
 Annie Mumolo
 Perry Mattfeld

Production
In December 2018, it was announced that an adaption of the Robinne Lee novel The Idea Of You had been opted by Welle Entertainment with Cathy Schulman and Gabrielle Union producing. Union named the book amongst her ten favourite of all time in 2018. Union and Lee have been friends since the early 2000s. In June 2021 it was revealed that Jennifer Westfelft had adapted the novel and Anne Hathaway was cast in the starring role. In August 2022 Michael Showalter was confirmed as director. In September 2022 Nicholas Galitzine was added to the cast as the lead singer of "the hottest boyband on the planet." In October 2022, Ella Rubin was revealed to be playing Hathaway's daughter and that principal photography had commenced. Following shortly after that announcement Annie Mumolo, Reid Scott, Perry Mattfeld and Jordan Aaron Hall were revealed to have joined the cast as well as Jaiden Anthony, Raymond Cham, Vik White and Dakota Adam as the rest of the band Galitzine fronts.

Filming took place in Atlanta, Georgia and surrounding areas from October 2022 with Galizitine and Hathaway pictured in the media filming together on set in Savannah, Georgia.

Reception
Grazia described the film as being based on Harry Styles fan fiction. Vogue described the plot as a “socio-cultural commentary about aging and a woman’s worth”.

References

External links
 

Films about music festivals
Upcoming films
American romantic comedy-drama films
Films about music and musicians
Films set in music venues
2020s English-language films